Barásoain is a town and municipality in the autonomous community of Navarre, northern Spain, within the historical lands of the Basque Country (greater region).  the population stands at 621. It is located approximately 25 km south of Pamplona, the provincial capital.

Famous citizens
 Martín de Azpilcueta (1492–1586). Spanish canonist and theologian in his time, and an early economist, known as Doctor Navarrus
 José Julián de Aranguren (1801–1861). Archbishop of Manila (Filipinas)
 Manuel Turrillas (1905–1997), "Maestro Turrillas", one of the most popular composers of Navarra; composed the most popular hymns of the main San Fermines Associations', Aldapa, Anaitasuna, La Jarana, Muthiko, Oberena, and the Osasuna football club hymn.

Geography
Barasoain is located 25 km south of Pamplona and 15 km north of Tafalla, on a promontory of 523 m above sea level. The point of lowest altitude of the village is situated at 492 meters, on the river Zidacos bank, and the highest is Mount Artebeltz, at 644 metres. It is the largest village in the Orba valley, known as the Valdorba which was made famous by the legendary singer songwriter Benito Lertxundi

Neighbouring municipalities

The municipality of Barásoain is closely linked to its neighbouring township, Garínoain. Despite their administrative borders, separated by a street, both municipalities form a single urban conglomeration. Other surrounding municipalities are (clockwise starting from west) are Artajona, Añorbe, Tirapu, Olcoz, Unzué and Olóriz.

Climate

Barásoain is located in a transitional climatic region. It borders the Oceanic and the Mediterranean climates, showing a pattern influenced by both. It is, nevertheless, classified as having an oceanic climate (Köppen Cfb).

Government
Barásoain belongs to the Judicial district of Tafalla, within the merindad de Olite, one of the five merindades, the Medieval administrative subdivision that has historically divided the region of Navarre.

Demography
Although the population of Barásoain has been either static or slowly declining for the 20th century, there has been an upturn in the figures in recent years due to the new residential development. The village has physically expanded and new people from other places have come to Barasoain, mostly from Pamplona.

References

External links

 barasoain.net - official website 
 Barásoain in the Bernardo Estornés Lasa - Auñamendi Encyclopedia (Euskomedia Fundazioa) 

Municipalities in Navarre